Conor Morgan (born 3 August 1994) is an Irish-Canadian professional basketball player for Bahçeşehir Koleji of the Turkish Basketball Super League (BSL). He also plays for the Canadian national team.

College career
Morgan played college basketball for the Canadian team UBC Thunderbirds representing the University of British Columbia, in his senior season he averaged 23.9 points and 9.7 rebounds per game.

Professional career
Morgan started his professional career with the New Zealand side Southland Sharks in 2017, he averaged 15.61 points, 5.56 rebounds and 3 assists at the club and he won the New Zealand pro league championship with the team also. He signed a two-year deal with the Spanish side Joventut Badalona in 2018, In the 2018–19 season, he averaged 6.6 points, 2.2 rebounds and 0.4 assist. In the 2019-20 season, he averaged 9.1 points and 3.3 rebounds per game. On 6 June 2020, he signed a one-year contract extension with an option for an additional year. Morgan parted ways with the team in June 2021.

On June 30, 2021, he has signed with MoraBanc Andorra of the Liga ACB.

On August 14, 2022, he has signed with Śląsk Wrocław of the PLK.

On February 5, 2023, he signed with Bahçeşehir Koleji of the Turkish Basketball Super League (BSL).

National team career
Morgan  was a member of the silver medal winning Canadian national basketball team at the 2018 Commonwealth Games. Morgan also represented the Canada at the 2019 FIBA Basketball World Cup in China, where he averaged 6.3 points, 2.3 rebound and 0.3 assists per game.

References

1994 births
Living people
2019 FIBA Basketball World Cup players
Bahçeşehir Koleji S.K. players
Basketball people from British Columbia
Basketball players at the 2018 Commonwealth Games
BC Andorra players
Expatriate basketball people in Andorra
Canadian expatriate basketball people in New Zealand
Canadian expatriate basketball people in Spain
Canadian men's basketball players
Canadian people of Irish descent
Commonwealth Games medallists in basketball
Commonwealth Games silver medallists for Canada
Fraser Valley Bandits players
Joventut Badalona players
Liga ACB players
Medallists at the 2018 Commonwealth Games
Śląsk Wrocław basketball players
Southland Sharks players
Sportspeople from Victoria, British Columbia
UBC Thunderbirds basketball players